Monte Miletto is a mountain of Molise, Italy. It has an elevation of 2,050 metres above sea level.

Mountains of Campania